Cho Hyun-Wook (born 15 March 1970) is a retired South Korean high jumper.

He competed at the 1988, 1992 and 1996 Olympic Games, but did not reach the final.

His personal best jump is 2.28 metres, achieved in May 1992 in Seoul.

References

1970 births
Living people
South Korean male high jumpers
Athletes (track and field) at the 1988 Summer Olympics
Athletes (track and field) at the 1992 Summer Olympics
Athletes (track and field) at the 1996 Summer Olympics
Olympic athletes of South Korea
Asian Games medalists in athletics (track and field)
Asian Games bronze medalists for South Korea
Athletes (track and field) at the 1990 Asian Games
Medalists at the 1990 Asian Games
Athletes (track and field) at the 1994 Asian Games
20th-century South Korean people